Flemming Davanger (born 1 April 1963 in Bergen, Norway) is a Norwegian curler from Bærum.

Curling career
In , Davanger played in his first World Curling Championships playing third for Tormod Andreassen, and they finished in sixth place. Later that year, the team picked up a bronze at the 1986 European Curling Championships.

Davanger's next success would come at the 1992 Winter Olympics, when curling was a demonstration sport. Davanger, now playing second for Andreassen would bring home the silver medal for Norway, much to the delight of his coach Forest Juziuk. After a couple of poor performances at the World Championships, Davanger moved to play second for his old junior skip Pål Trulsen. Their first World Championships was in 1999 when they finished in fifth. 2000 was no better, when they finished in 7th place. Finally in 2001 Norway got a break, picking up the bronze medal. They would then go on to win the gold medal at the 2002 Winter Olympics followed by a silver at the World Championships that year. Since then, the team has had some success. They have finished no worse than fourth place at the Worlds or the European Championships. They picked up a bronze at the Worlds in 2003, a bronze at the European Championships in 2004 and a gold at the European Championships in 2005.

References

External links

Norwegian male curlers
Olympic curlers of Norway
Curlers at the 1992 Winter Olympics
Curlers at the 2002 Winter Olympics
Curlers at the 2006 Winter Olympics
Olympic gold medalists for Norway
Living people
1963 births
Olympic medalists in curling
Medalists at the 2002 Winter Olympics
Medalists at the 1992 Winter Olympics
Olympic silver medalists for Norway
Continental Cup of Curling participants
European curling champions
Sportspeople from Bergen
Sportspeople from Bærum